Abigail Lindo (3 August 1803 – 28 August 1848) was a British lexicographer. She was the first British Jew who compiled a Hebrew-English dictionary. She is considered to be the only woman to have made a significant contribution to philology in the nineteenth century.

Life

Lindo was born in London in 1803. She was one of the eighteen children of Sarah (born Mocatta) and David Abarbanel Lindo. Her parents were Sephardi Jews and members of leading families. She was related to Benjamin Disraeli and one of her cousins was Sir Moses Montefiore. It was her father who performed Disraeli's circumcision. It was her mother's brother, Moses Mocatta who saw to her education. Under his guidance, she became a respected scholar of the Bible with a wide knowledge of Hebrew.

She came to prominence after she created an English-Hebrew vocabulary for her own use. Encouraged by her uncle, she published her work in 1837, and recommended it to be used in the different Jewish Schools in Britain. She was the first British Jew to compile and publish a Hebrew-English dictionary, and the first woman in Great Britain to publish a book under her own name. The list was later extended.

Her 1837 vocabulary was extended in 1842 and by 1846 she had created a complete "A Hebrew-English and English-Hebrew Dictionary". Leading lexicographers used her book as well as students of Hebrew. Her work is now regarded as amateur as she had no knowledge of related languages such as Arabic or Aramaic, but she is considered the only woman to have made a significant contribution to philology in the nineteenth century. All of her books identify the author as the third daughter of her father and it is his picture which is included in her books.

Lindo died in London in 1848.

References

1803 births
1848 deaths
Academics from London
Women lexicographers
British lexicographers
19th-century lexicographers
19th-century women writers
English people of Spanish-Jewish descent
English Sephardi Jews